The Kitchen in Paris is a 2014 Russian comedy, a first feature film directed by Dmitriy Dyachenko of the television channel by STS and company by Yellow, Black and White-Group. It is a continuation of the third season of the television series The Kitchen (2012-2016). It stars Dmitry Nazarov, Mark Bogatyryov, Yelena Podkaminskaya and Dmitry Nagiyev.

The Kitchen in Paris was theatrically released in Russia on May 1, 2014 by Central Partnership.

Plot 
After the events of the third season, the «Claude Monet» restaurant continued and strengthened its fame in Moscow, remaining a prosperous establishment with a skilled owner, a diligent director and excellent cuisine. But all the hopes and efforts of the team are interrupted by the failure of the restaurant in the preparation and conduct of an international level event - a meeting of the presidents of Russia and France.

The workers and the owner of the restaurant have to look for a new place of work, and, leaving the previous «Claude Monet», they rush to the “city of love”, the capital of France - Paris. New work, new color and new rivals. Victor Barinov meets his own father - the chef of the best restaurant in Paris, and Max Lavrov has to compete with the French boyfriend Vika Goncharova, who in the end will try to make her an offer of marriage. The film ends with the wedding of Max Lavrov and Vika Lavrova (Goncharova), as well as the return of the restaurant team to Russia.

Cast 
 Dmitry Nazarov as Viktor Petrovich Barinov, the chef
  as Maxim "Max" Leonidovich Lavrov, a cook
 Yelena Podkaminskaya as Viktoria "Vika" Sergeevna Goncharova, the art director of the restaurant,
 Dmitry Nagiyev as himself, the owner of both restaurants
 Oleg Tabakov
 Vincent Perez as Head of Protocol, the French President Nicolas DuPont, Vika's boyfriend
 Viktor Khorinyak as Konstantin "Kostya" Konstantinovich Anisimov, is a barman at the restaurant,
  as Anastasia "Nastya" Stephanovna Fomina, the waitress «Claude Monet».
  as Arseniy "Senya" Andreevich Chuganin, a cook who specializes in meat.
 Mikhail Tarabukin as Feodor "Fedya" Mikhailovich Yurchenko, a cook who specializes in fish.
 Sergey Epishev as Lev Solovyov
 Nikita Tarasov as Ludvik "Lui" Benua, a pastry-baker from Provence, France.
 Janil Asanbekova as Ainura Jannatbekovna Kenensarova, a cleaner from Kyrgyzstan, cleaning-dishwasher «Claude Monet».
 Elena Chernyavskaya as Angelina Yaroslavovna Smirnova, hostess «Claude Monet».
 Irina Temicheva as Eva Beletskaya, the waitress «Claude Monet».
 Helena Noguerra

Production
At the beginning of the film, some moments of the cartoon Ratatouille (film) are parodied, in the Russian dubbing of which the actor Dmitry Nazarov took part. Also at the beginning of the film, the Chef has a DVD with a cartoon in his office.

On the very first day, they shot the most difficult scene in Paris: a meeting of the Presidents of France and Russia, in which dozens of actors and extras were involved, transport and sophisticated equipment.

To remove the mouse’s mileage on the floor and the view “with the mouse’s eyes”, technicians from the film crew built a special device - a mini-crane. Also, unusual angles were achieved by placing the GoPro camera inside the duck and in the Soup.

In France, more than 35 French were employed in the film crew. Local filmmakers noted that this is an unprecedented number for a foreign project.

Casting
Vincent Perez helped Yelena Podkaminskaya and Nikita Tarasov master all the nuances of French pronunciation.

For the role of Nicolas DuPont, the head of the protocol of the French President, the creators considered Vincent Cassel.

Filming
Principal photography in Paris was complicated by numerous bureaucratic procedures. Literally all the movements of the film crew were regulated by special permissions, the police (both "land" and river) conducted constant checks.

Release
The premiere took place in all cinemas on May 1, 2014 by Central Partnership.

See also
Films and spin-offs
 The Kitchen. The Last Battle (2017), a second feature film
 Hotel Belgrade (2020), a third feature film

References

External links 
 Official website at Yellow, Black and White 
 
 
 

2014 films
2010s Russian-language films
2014 comedy films
Russian comedy films
Films based on television series
Cooking films
Films about chefs
Films about food and drink
Films about alcoholic drinks
Films set in Moscow
Films set in Russia
Films set in restaurants
Films set in Paris
Films set in France